Puncheon Mill House, also known as Puncheon's Landing, is a historic home located at Pocomoke City, Somerset County, Maryland. It is a two-story, three-by-two-bay gable-front frame dwelling supported on a raised common bond brick foundation. It was built between 1810 and 1820, and is sheathed with beaded cypress weatherboards and covered with a medium-pitched wood shingle roof. The house was restored and expanded in the 1960s with the addition of a kitchen wing.

It was listed on the National Register of Historic Places in 1994.

References

External links

, including undated photo, at Maryland Historical Trust

Houses in Somerset County, Maryland
Houses on the National Register of Historic Places in Maryland
Houses completed in 1820
National Register of Historic Places in Somerset County, Maryland